The 2000 World Outdoor Bowls Championship women's singles was held in Moama, Australia from 8–25 March 2000.

The gold medal was won by Margaret Johnston of Ireland.

Section tables

Section A

Section B

Bronze-medal match
 Murphy bt  Horman 21-4

Gold-medal match
 Johnston bt  Jones 21-14

References

Wom
World
Bow